George Drummond (1688–1766) was a Scottish politician.

George Drummond may also refer to:

George Drummond (footballer, born 1865) (1865–1914), Scottish footballer
George Drummond (Cowdenbeath footballer) (c. 1872–1912), Scottish footballer
George Alexander Drummond (1829–1910), Scottish-Canadian businessman and senator
George Hay-Drummond, 12th Earl of Kinnoull (1827–1897), Scottish earl
George Drummond (cricketer) (1883–1963), English cricketer

See also